Rajiv Rishyakaran (Tamil: ரஜிவ் ரிஷ்யகரன்) (born 12 October 1981) is a Malaysian politician who has served as Member of the Selangor State Legislative Assembly (MLA) for Bukit Gasing since May 2013. He is a member of the Democratic Action Party (DAP), a component party of the Pakatan Harapan (PH) coalition. His precedecessor as Bukit Gasing MLA is the late Edward Lee Poh Lin whose untimely death in 2011 left the seat vacant for two years before the 2013 Selangor state election.

Personal background and education

Rajiv Rishyakaran was born on 12 October 1981, at Hospital Universiti, Kuala Lumpur. Rajiv is the eldest of five (5) brothers. His father, Rishyakaran Karthigasu (1949-) is a retired Ministry of Health officer whilst his mother, Rajini Chandrapal (1953-) retired from teaching to be a homemaker. He is of 4th generation Malaysian Tamil descent.

Rajiv was born and bred in the Klang Valley, apart from a brief relocation to Ipoh, Perak (from age 10–15) where his father was based as a civil servant. The family later moved to Subang Jaya, Selangor where Rajiv finished secondary school.

Rajiv attended Kolej Universiti Teknologi Tun Hussein Onn, Johor, graduating in 2003 with a degree in Electrical Engineering specializing in Instrumentation & Automation. Upon graduation, Rajiv worked in Kuala Lumpur as a project engineer with Prestige Engineering Sdn. Bhd.

Rajiv was married in 2011 to Ana Gella, and later separated in 2021. They both share 3 children Julia (born 2017), Elisha (born 2018), and Noah (born 2021).

Political career

Early involvement 
Rajiv's involvement in politics began when friend and fellow church member, Hannah Yeoh Tseow Suan was fielded to run for the state seat of Subang Jaya in 2008.

Democratic Action Party (DAP) 
Rajiv joined the Democratic Action Party (DAP) in 2008 and, along with Hannah Yeoh and Edward Ling, was one of the founding members of DAP's USJ branch. In 2009, Rajiv was appointed DAP Youth Selangor organizing secretary. He was elected DAP Youth Selangor State Secretary in 2012 and appointed to the DAP Youth National Executive Committee (NEC).

Majlis Perbandaran Subang Jaya (MPSJ) 
In 2009, Rajiv was appointed Majlis Perbandaran Subang Jaya (MPSJ) Councillor, where he stayed until the 2013 elections. While in MPSJ, he was responsible for Zone 3 (USJ 2-15) until June 2012 when he was reassigned to Zone 3 (SS12-19) until May 2013. Throughout his tenure at MPSJ, he simultaneously served as Hannah Yeoh's Special Assistant. The Subang Jaya Urban Forest and the Subang Jaya Voluntary Patrol Unit (VPU), among others, were attributed to the role he played within the council and as Yeoh's assistant.

Selangor State Legislative Assembly 
Three (3) days before the Nomination day for the 2013 General Elections, Rajiv was picked to contest for the state seat of Bukit Gasing, taking over Kasthuri Patto who ran for the Parliamentary seat of Batu Kawan, Penang. Rajiv listed several concerns as part of his GE13 campaign, pledging to be corruption-free and to champion:
 Development issues and its effect on quality of life
 Bettering traffic conditions and public transport
 Reducing crime and improving security
 Enhancing the public consultation process
 Improving the local council
 Local government elections
 Enquiry on freehold and leasehold land
 Conserving the environment
Rajiv received almost 78% of the total votes, giving him a landslide victory over Gerakan's Juan Sei Chang and Independent candidates Mak Khuin Weng and Simon Lee Chung Hsin.

In the 2018 General Elections, Rajiv contested and managed to won for the second-term reelection for his Bukit Gasing state seat again.

In July 2019, he submitted a motion to the Selangor State Assembly which aimed to prohibit party hopping among elected representatives in the State. This came after the downfall of the Pakatan Harapan Government, after Bersatu and majority of its members left the coalition to form Perikatan Nasional with UMNO.

Ministry of Energy, Science and Technology, Environment, and Climate Change 

After Pakatan Harapan's unprecedented triumph over Barisan Nasional in 2018, Yeo Bee Yin was appointed as the Minister for Energy, Science and Technology, Environment, and Climate Change (MESTECC). Yeo subsequently appointed Rajiv as her Special Functions Officer, where he not only assisted in key ministerial processes but was also appointed into the board of the Sustainable Energy Development Authority, where he advocated for the widespread use of solar energy in the country.

Focus areas 
Rajiv is DAP Socialist Youth's (DAPSY) National Assistant Secretary of Publicity and was co-opted as DAP Selangor state committee member in 2013 and 2015. In the Selangor state assembly, Rajiv is a member of the Select Committees (Jawatankuasa Pilihan) on Local Government and Water Resources Management.

Rajiv's areas of interest are town planning, affordable housing and improving public transportation. Along with other state assembly representatives, he consistently called for a holistic “traffic masterplan” and believes that funds allocated for transportation will be better spent on extending the reach & connectivity of public transportation rather than building more highways. He is vocal about the need to replace ageing infrastructure.

Election results

See also
 Bukit Gasing (state constituency)

References

Living people
1981 births
Kuala Lumpur politicians
Malaysian engineers
Malaysian politicians of Indian descent
Democratic Action Party (Malaysia) politicians
Members of the Selangor State Legislative Assembly